Kidinakorner (stylized as KIDinaKORNER) is an American record company founded in 2011 by British music producer and songwriter Alexander "Alex da Kid" Grant. The company houses a record label, music publishing, commercial production and a marketing agency. The company is home to several prominent acts in the music industry, including Imagine Dragons and X Ambassadors.

Record label
In 2010, Alexander "Alex da Kid" Grant founded Wonderland Entertainment, a publishing and production company. On August 10, 2010, it was revealed he had signed American singer-songwriter Skylar Grey, to a publishing deal. On June 1, 2011, Interscope Geffen A&M Records, a subsidiary of Universal Music Group, announced Grant signed a joint venture deal to launch his label imprint, KIDinaKORNER. The announcement came after Grant produced three of 2010's biggest singles, namely "Airplanes," "Love the Way You Lie," and "Coming Home," as well as 2011's "I Need a Doctor." On June 14, 2011, KIDinaKORNER released Skylar Grey's debut single, titled "Dance Without You," via digital distribution.

In November 2011, Grant signed American rock band Imagine Dragons and in 2012, released their debut album, Night Visions. Night Visions, included the Diamond-certified single "Radioactive", which spent a record-setting 87 weeks on the US Billboard Hot 100 chart. In January 2013, British singer-songwriter Jamie N Commons, signed a record deal with KIDinaKORNER/Interscope. In 2015, KIDinaKORNER released X Ambassadors debut, VHS, which was certified gold by the RIAA. In 2016, Alex da Kid released his debut single "Not Easy" featuring X Ambassadors, Elle King & Wiz Khalifa.

On the 19th of July, Skylar Grey announced that she had left Interscope/KidinaKorner.

Marketing 
After partnering with brands like Jeep, Target, and Budweiser, KIDinaKORNER entered into joint venture with WPP, one of the largest marketing and communications companies in the world, to build marketing campaigns centered around music.

Artists

Releases

References

External links
Interscope.com/kidinakorner

Record labels established in 2011
American record labels
Music production companies
Labels distributed by Universal Music Group
Alternative rock record labels
Contemporary R&B record labels
Vanity record labels